The 2014 Ondrej Nepela Trophy was the 22nd edition of an annual senior international figure skating competition held in Bratislava, Slovakia. A part of the 2014–15 ISU Challenger Series, it was held on October 1–5, 2014 at the Ondrej Nepela Ice Rink. Medals were awarded in the disciplines of men's singles, ladies' singles, and ice dancing. The pairs' event was cancelled after the entries withdrew.

Entries

Results

Men

Ladies

Ice dancing

References

External links
 Entries
 2014 Ondrej Nepela Trophy results
 22nd Ondrej Nepela Trophy

Ondrej Nepela Memorial
Ondrej Nepela Trophy, 2014
Ondrej Nepela Trophy